Knaplundsøya or Godøya is an island in Bodø Municipality in Nordland county, Norway.  The  island lies just southeast of the town of Bodø, between the Saltfjorden and the Skjerstadfjorden.  The island is connected to the mainland and to the neighboring island of Straumøya by the Norwegian County Road 17.  The Saltstraumen strait and its famous maelstrom are located between Straumøya and Knaplundsøya.  The island had 392 residents in 2016, mostly living on the north and west shores of the island.

See also
List of islands of Norway

References

Bodø
Islands of Nordland